Peter Tomsen (born November 19, 1940) is an American retired diplomat and educator, serving as U.S. Special Envoy to Afghanistan from 1989 to 1992, United States Ambassador to Armenia between 1995 and 1998, and was Deputy Ambassador at the United States Embassy in Beijing from 1986 to 1989. Ambassador Tomsen’s thirty-two year diplomatic career emphasized South and Central Asia, Northeast Asia and the former Soviet Union.

Early life
Tomsen was born in Cleveland, Ohio on November 19, 1940. He graduated from Sycamore High School in Cincinnati, Ohio, and attended college at Wittenberg University in Springfield, Ohio, receiving a degree in political science in 1962. Tomsen was awarded a Heinz fellowship for post-graduate studies at the University of Pittsburgh. Receiving his master's degree in public and international affairs, Tomsen spent two years working in the Peace Corps in Nepal. Tomsen studied Nepali and taught civics and English in a newly founded 80-student college in a Himalayan town in western Nepal. Tomsen chose to extend his Peace Corps service for six months to be headmaster of a Tibetan refugee school.

Diplomatic and political career
Ambassador Tomsen entered the Foreign Service in 1967. He served as Principal Deputy Assistant Secretary of State for East Asian and Pacific Affairs, 1993 - 1995, and was United States ambassador to Armenia from 1995 to 1998. He was deputy chief of mission of the U.S. Embassy in Beijing, spanning from 1986 to 1989. He served in the political-military office of the U.S. Embassy in Bangkok, 1967 - 1968. After a year of Vietnamese language training in Washington in early 1969, he was assigned to the U.S. Civilian-Military Advisory Organization in South Vietnam, 1969 - 1970. He was a political officer of the U.S. Embassy in New Delhi, 1971 - 1975; a political officer of the U.S. Embassy in Moscow, 1977 - 1978; and a political officer of the U.S. Embassy in Beijing, 1981 - 1983. From 1984 to 1987, he served in the Department of State as office director of India, Nepal, Sri Lanka, Bhutan, and the Maldives.
1989-1992: US Special Envoy to Afghanistan.

Selected works

References

External links
Pbs.org
Takepart.com
Cgi.cnn.com
Presidency.ucsb.edu
History.state.gov
Thenation.com

1940 births
Living people
Ambassadors of the United States to Armenia
United States Foreign Service personnel
American expatriates in Nepal
American expatriates in China
American expatriates in Thailand
American expatriates in Vietnam
American expatriates in India
American expatriates in Afghanistan
American expatriates in the Soviet Union
20th-century American diplomats